Dafne and the Rest is a Spanish television series created, written, directed and starred by Abril Zamora for HBO Max. It is one of the first Spanish original titles of the HBO Max catalogue, which debuted in Europe on 26 October 2021.

Premise 
The fiction (a dramedy) follows Dafne, a young transgender woman with a precarious job who has just left a relationship, and finds out to be infatuated with her closest friend instead. It takes place in Madrid.

Cast

Production and release 
It consists of 8 episodes featuring an average running time of 30 minutes. Miguel Salvat, Steve Matthews and Antony Root were credited as executive producers on behalf of WarnerMedia whereas Santi Botello was credited on behalf of Campanilla Films. Shooting wrapped in Madrid towards May 2021. The series was originally intended to be a HBO Europe original, but following the preparation for the HBO Max rollout in selected European countries in the Fall of 2021, it was ensuingly branded as a HBO Max original. The first teaser trailer was released on 13 September 2021. The series was presented together with other HBO Max originals (Venga Juan, Sin novedad and ¡García!) at the 69th San Sebastián Film Festival in September 2021.

References

External links

2021 Spanish television series debuts
Television shows filmed in Spain
Spanish-language television shows
Television shows set in Madrid
Spanish comedy-drama television series
HBO Max original programming
Spanish LGBT-related television shows
2020s Spanish drama television series
2020s Spanish comedy television series
Television series by Producciones Mandarina